Kosmos 196 ( meaning Cosmos 196), also known as DS-U1-G No.2, was a Soviet satellite which was launched in 1967 as part of the Dnepropetrovsk Sputnik programme. It was a  spacecraft, which was built by the Yuzhnoye Design Office, and was used to study the effects of solar activity on the upper atmosphere.

A Kosmos-2I 63S1 carrier rocket was used to launch Kosmos 196 into low Earth orbit. The launch took place from Site 86/1 at Kapustin Yar. The launch occurred at 06:30:07 GMT on 19 December 1967, and resulted in the successfully insertion of the satellite into low Earth orbit. Upon reaching orbit, the satellite was assigned its Kosmos designation, and received the International Designator 1967-125A. The North American Air Defense Command assigned it the catalogue number 03074.

Kosmos 196 was the second of two DS-U1-G satellites to be launched, after Kosmos 108. It completed operations on 7 February 1968. On 7 July 1968, it decayed from orbit and reentered the atmosphere.

See also

 1967 in spaceflight

References

Spacecraft launched in 1967
Kosmos satellites
1967 in the Soviet Union
Dnepropetrovsk Sputnik program